Lorna Lewis (died 1962) was a British writer who published a number of popular children's books during the middle part of the 20th century. Among these, the best known is perhaps Leonardo the Inventor, which was included in the New Windmill Series of children's books under the Heinemann imprint.

Selected works
 The Little French Poodle (1934)
 The Children's Holiday Book of Verse (1935) (editor)
 Jubilee and Her Mother (1936) 
 Zoo Roundabout (1937) 
 The Children's Zoo (1939) 
 Holiday Luck (1939) 
 Nine Dogs (1940) 
 Feud in the Factory (1944) 
 Marriotts Go North (1949) 
 June Grey: Fashion Student (1953) 
 Hotel Doorway (1953)

1962 deaths
British writers
Year of birth missing